Abdullah Al-Jouei (born 2 March 1995) is a Saudi Arabian professional footballer who plays as a winger for Al-Tai, on loan from Al-Shabab, and the Saudi Arabia national team.

Club career

Al-Batin
Al-Jouei started his career with Al-Hilal youth team then moved to Al-Batin in January 2017. Al-Jouei signed a six-month contract with the club. He made his debut on 27 January 2017 in the league match against Al-Khaleej. He ended his first at the league with 10 appearances and 0 goals. Al-Jouei renewed his contract for a further year on 23 May 2017. In his second season with Al-Batin, Al-Jouei made 25 appearances across all competitions and scored 0 goals.

Marítimo
On 17 March 2018, Al-Jouei signed a four-year professional contract with Portuguese side C.S. Marítimo. He officially joined the club on 26 June 2018 following the expiry of his contract with Al-Batin. On 31 October 2018, Al-Jouei was in the matchday squad for the first time in the Taça da Liga match against Feirense. He was an unused substitute as Marítimo lost 3–2. Al-Jouei was not included in any further matchday squads and made only one appearance for the B team.

Al-Taawoun
After making no appearances for the Marítimo first team, Al-Jouei left Portugal and returned to Saudi Arabia on 3 February 2019. He signed a three-year contract with Al-Taawoun. He made his debut on 14 March 2019 by coming off the bench in the league match against Al-Fateh. That would be his only appearance for Al-Taawoun before being sent on loan to Damac on 21 January 2020.

International career
On 9 October 2017, Al-Jouei made his senior international debut in a friendly match. Saudi Arabia beat Jamaica 5–2. He came off the bench and scored the 5th goal.

Career statistics
Scores and results list Jamaica's goal tally first.

Honours
Al-Taawoun
King Cup: 2019

References

External links
 

1995 births
Living people
Saudi Arabian footballers
Saudi Arabia youth international footballers
Saudi Arabia international footballers
Association football midfielders
Al Batin FC players
C.S. Marítimo players
Al-Taawoun FC players
Damac FC players
Al-Shabab FC (Riyadh) players
Al-Tai FC players
Saudi Professional League players
Primeira Liga players
Expatriate footballers in Portugal
Saudi Arabian expatriate sportspeople in Portugal
Saudi Arabian expatriate footballers